Tina Brown (born 22 August 1976) is a British female former distance runner who competed mostly in the 3000 metres steeplechase and the 1500 metres. She twice represented England in the steeplechase at the Commonwealth Games (2006 and 2010). She was nationally prominent during the period when the women's steeplechase event gained championship level status, and she set a British record of 9:48.57 minutes in 2005 (beaten a year later by Lizzie Hall).

A member of Coventry Godiva Harriers, she was twice a national champion in the steeplechase, winning the first ever national women's race over the 3000 m distance in 2004 and retaining that title the following year ahead of her rival Jo Ankier. She also ranked highly at national level in the 3000 metres flat, with her best finish being runner-up to Lisa Dobriskey at the 2006 AAA Indoor Championships.

National titles
AAA Championships
Steeplechase: 2004, 2005

International competitions

References

External links

1976 births
Living people
British female steeplechase runners
British female long-distance runners
British female middle-distance runners
English female steeplechase runners
English female long-distance runners
English female middle-distance runners
Athletes (track and field) at the 2006 Commonwealth Games
Athletes (track and field) at the 2010 Commonwealth Games
Commonwealth Games competitors for England